Saitō is a Japanese surname. Saito may also refer to:

Places and transportation
Saito, Miyazaki (西都 (lit. "west capital")), a city in Miyazaki Prefecture, Japan
2615 Saito, a main-belt asteroid discovered on September 4, 1951
Saitō Garden (Ishinomaki), a garden in Ishinomaki, Miyagi Prefecture, Japan
Sushi Saito, a sushi restaurant in Tokyo
Osaka Monorail Saito Line, a line on the monorail in Osaka, Japan
Saito-nishi Station, a station on the Osaka Monorail

Other uses
Saito, a japanese clan from Echizen province
Saito (Ghost in the Shell), a character in the anime series Ghost in the Shell
, a character in the video game series Mega Man Battle Network
, a character in the light novel series The Familiar of Zero
Saito Nagasaki (born 1981), Singaporean musician, DJ and promoter

See also
Itakura–Saito distance, a measure of the perceptual difference between an original spectrum and an approximation of that spectrum
Saito Kinen Festival Matsumoto, an annual classical music festival held in the Japanese Alps near Matsumoto
Saito suplex, an offensive move named for Masa Saito used in professional sport wrestling

Japanese masculine given names